Lüshi refers to a specific form of Classical Chinese poetry verse form. One of the most important poetry forms of classical Chinese poetry, the lüshi refers to an eight-line regulated verse form with lines made up of five, six, or seven characters; thus:

Five-character eight-line regulated verse (wulü): a form of regulated verse with eight lines of five characters each.
Six-character eight-line regulated verse is relatively rare.
Seven-character eight-line regulated verse (qilü): a form of regulated verse with eight lines of seven characters each.
Extended forms (pailü): expansion of the forms listed above with more than eight lines.

All lüshi forms are rhymed on the even lines, with one rhyme being used throughout the poem. Also, and definitionally, the tonal profile of the poem is controlled (that is, "regulated").

Historical development
Although the idea of regulating the tonal pattern of poetry can be traced back to Shen Yue, the lüshi form did not reach its final codification until the seventh century.

Well-known examples 
Well-known examples of the form include the Tang poet Li Bai's "Seeing Off a Friend" (送友人) and "On Climbing in Nanjing to the Terrace of Phoenixes" (登金陵鳳凰臺).

See also 
 Classical Chinese poetry forms
 Jueju
 Regulated verse

References

Citations

Sources 

 Frankel, Hans H. (1978). The Flowering Plum and the Palace Lady. (New Haven and London: Yale University Press) 
 Watson, Burton (1971). CHINESE LYRICISM: Shih Poetry from the Second to the Twelfth Century. (New York: Columbia University Press). 
 Yip, Wai-lim  (1997). Chinese Poetry: An Anthology of Major Modes and Genres . (Durham and London: Duke University Press). 

Chinese poetry forms